The Battle of San Jacinto refers to at least two paintings by Henry Arthur McArdle, depicting the Battle of San Jacinto.

References

History paintings
Paintings in Austin, Texas
1895 paintings
1901 paintings